Lara Dutta (born 16 April 1978) is an Indian actress, entrepreneur and the winner of the Miss Universe 2000 pageant. She was previously crowned as Miss Intercontinental 1997. In her career, she has primarily worked in Hindi films. She is the recipient of several accolades including a Filmfare Award. She established herself as one of the prominent leading ladies of the 2000s.

Dutta made her acting debut with Andaaz (2003), which won her Filmfare Award for Best Female Debut. She went onto appear in commercially successful films including Masti (2004), No Entry (2005), Bhagam Bhag (2006), Jhoom Barabar Jhoom (2007), Partner (2007), Housefull (2010), Chalo Dilli (2011), Don 2 (2011) and Singh Is Bliing (2015).

Dutta appeared in British TV series, Beecham House. She made her web debut in 2020 with Hundred. In 2021, she portrayed Indira Gandhi in Bell Bottom.

Early life and education
Dutta was born to a Hindu father and an Anglo-Indian mother in Ghaziabad, Uttar Pradesh. Her father is Wing Commander L. K. Dutta (retired) and her mother is Jennifer Dutta. Her elder sister Sabrina and her younger sister Cheryl have served in the Indian Air Force. Nitin Sawhney, who is a music composer and DJ is Dutta's cousin.

The Dutta family moved to Bangalore in 1981 where she completed high school from St. Francis Xavier Girls' High School and the Frank Anthony Public School. She graduated with a degree in economics and a minor in communications from the University of Mumbai. She is fluent in English and Hindi and can also speak Punjabi and Kannada.

Personal life
Lara Dutta had a nine-year relationship with actor and model Kelly Dorji. She then briefly dated American professional baseball player Derek Jeter.

In September 2010, she got engaged to Indian tennis player, Mahesh Bhupathi. They married on 16 February 2011 in a civil ceremony in Bandra and followed it with a ceremony on 20 February 2011 at Sunset Point in Goa. On 1 August 2011, Dutta confirmed that she was pregnant with their first child. Their daughter Saira Bhupathi was born on 20 January 2012.

Pageantry
Dutta won the annual Gladrags Megamodel India competition in 1995, thus winning the right to enter the 1997 Miss Intercontinental Pageant. She was later crowned Miss Intercontinental 1997. 
In the year 2000, she took part in the Femina Miss India contest. In the grand finale, all her fellow Top 5 delegates were asked the same question – "If you were a police officer in the Garden of Eden, who would you punish for the original sin: Adam, Eve, or the serpent?” Dutta replied by stating:

After this round, it was revealed that the scores of some contestants in the Top 5 had tied. All the delegates were subsequently asked a common question, so as to break the tie – "If ignorance is bliss, why do we seek knowledge?” to which Dutta expressed:

At the end of the event, she won the first place and the title of Femina Miss India Universe, earning the right to represent India at the 49th edition of Miss Universe.

Miss Universe
At Miss Universe 2000 in Cyprus, she achieved the highest score in the swimsuit competition and her finalist interview score was the highest individual score in any category in the history of the Miss Universe contest, as her interview saw a majority of the judges giving her the maximum 9.99 marks.

During the final question and answer round, the top 3 contestants were each asked the same question by the host, Sinbad: "Right now, there is a protest that has been staged outside the stadium posing pageants as an affront to women. Convince them that they are wrong". To which Dutta replied:

At the end of the event, Dutta was crowned as Miss Universe 2000, by the outgoing titleholder Mpule Kwelagobe of Botswana. Dutta's win led to her appointment as a UNFPA Goodwill Ambassador in 2001. In the same year, Priyanka Chopra and Dia Mirza won their respective Miss World and Miss Asia Pacific titles which gave India a rare triple victory in the world of beauty pageants. During her reign as Miss Universe, she visited 62 countries.

She is the second woman from India to be crowned Miss Universe. She received the highest score in the swimsuit competition and her finale interview score is the highest individual score in any category in the history of the Miss Universe contest.

She has been a UNFPA Goodwill Ambassador since 2001, shortly after her Miss Universe win. Dutta stated, "Celebrities with the power to affect their impressionable minds therefore have a moral responsibility to impart positive messages. I am committed to using any influence I may have to do just that as a Goodwill Ambassador of the United Nations Population Fund (UNFPA)".

Acting career

Debut and early work (2001–2004)
She signed up for the Tamil film, Arasatchi in 2002, but due to financial problems, it was only released in mid-2004. She made her Hindi debut in 2003 with the film Andaaz which was a box office success and won her a Filmfare Award for Best Female Debut. However, In the film, Dutta's voice was dubbed by Mona Shetty as the filmmakers wanted two distinct characters for the female leads and they needed Kajal, Dutta's character, to have a high-pitched voice. At the beginning of 2004, Dutta made a cameo appearance in Khakee in the song "Aisa Jadoo", which went on to become a chartbuster upon release . She then went on to appear in Bardaasht, which failed to do well at the box office. Her next release Aan: Men at Work was also a flop in India. Insan, Elaan and Jurm also ended up failing to do well at the box office. She later appeared in Masti which did well at the box office.

Lara Dutta revealed in an interview that she was offered a role in The Matrix franchise but turned down the offer due to her mother's illness at the time.

Before making her debut in movies, Dutta made an appearance in the music video of singer Abhijeet Bhattacharya's song titled ''Tu Chalu Hai Re''.

Breakthrough and success (2005–2010)
In 2005, Dutta appeared in Kaal, which was a moderate success at the box office. Dutta then appeared in No Entry opposite actors Anil Kapoor, Salman Khan, Fardeen Khan, Bipasha Basu, Esha Deol and Celina Jaitley, which went on to become the biggest hit of the year. She next appeared in Dosti: Friends Forever which was only an average grosser in India but became the biggest hit of the year in overseas markets. Dutta along with Sania Mirza participated in Kaun Banega Crorepati (season 2) as celebrity guests, on 13 November 2005.

In 2006, Lara Dutta appeared a cameo in Yash Raj Films's Fanaa in a scene that featured both leads Aamir Khan and Kajol. Dutta stated in an interview that she agreed to feature in Fanaa as she had previously turned down a cameo in Yash Raj's Hum Tum (2004).

Her first release of 2007 was Shaad Ali's Jhoom Barabar Jhoom. in which Dutta played a double-role, of Anaida and Laila, both love interests of Rikki Thukral (played by the film's main lead Abhishek Bachchan). The film was an underwhelming success at the domestic box office but did well overseas, especially in the United Kingdom. Dutta received praise for her performance in the film.

Her next release, Partner where she starred opposite Salman Khan was a blockbuster in India and became the third biggest grosser of the year. Dutta made a special appearance in Om Shanti Om. Dutta also presented a documentary film titled Sold: An MTV EXIT Special by Charmaine Choo which followed the tragedy of trafficking in South Asia where thousand of young girls and boys are sold into modern-day slavery.

In 2008, Dutta lent her voice for the animated film, Jumbo. However, the film failed to do well at the box office. She made a special appearance in Rab Ne Bana Di Jodi in the song "Phir Milenge Chalte Chalte" where she paid tribute to Helen, colorfully dressed, with jewels and feathers in a high hair bun. The underlying tune is "O Haseena Zulfon Wale Jaan-e-Jahaan" from the 1966 film Teesri Manzil.

Her 2009 release, Blue, was one of the most expensive movies of Indian cinema. Dutta had initially walked away from the project because the movie was entirely shot in the ocean and she didn't know swimming. However the male protagonist, Akshay Kumar encouraged her in learning how to swim and she immediately started training with a special coach. Blue was released on 16 October 2009. She stated that "The moment I got to know of it, I called Akshay and told him that I wouldn't be able to accept the assignment. He knew the reason behind my decision. Not many people are aware that I had almost drowned while shooting for Andaaz, Akshay had rescued me. When I reminded him I couldn't swim, he told me to forget my phobia and learn swimming pronto," said Dutta. "Today, I feel Blue has not merely made me overcome my phobias, but has also taught me something that will stay with me for the rest of my life". Despite a promising opening, the film failed to do well at the box office.

She also appeared in Do Knot Disturb, which took a good start at the box office, however dropped in the coming days and failed to do well. Her 2010 release Housefull was a major commercial success across India. She starred opposite Akshay Kumar, Deepika Padukone, Arjun Rampal, Jiah Khan and Riteish Deshmukh. It was the fifth biggest hit in the country at that time as it collected  at the box office.

Recent work and critical acclaim (2011–present)

In 2011, her first movie as a producer, Chalo Dilli was released. Moreover, the film and Dutta's performance was praised by critics. She did an item number in the song "Zara Dil Ko Thaam Lo" alongside Shah Rukh Khan in addition to an extended special appearance in Don 2 and the film was a major success, especially Lara's item number.

Following her post-pregnancy break from Hindi cinema, Dutta signed a movie titled David. Filming started by August 2012. The film released on 1 February 2013 and received mixed reviews. She signed a No Entry sequel titled No Entry Mein Entry.

In 2015, she starred in Singh Is Bliing. The film was a financial success, grossing over  1.16 billion worldwide. Her comic timing in the film was praised by critics. She played the role of Leena Becker in the film Fitoor, released in 2016. She played a crucial supporting role in the sports drama film Azhar. In 2018, she appeared in the film Welcome to New York.

In June 2019, Dutta appeared in the ITV 6-part drama, Beecham House where she played the role of Begum Samru.

In 2021, Dutta played the role of the former Prime Minister of India Indira Gandhi in the spy film Bell Bottom along with Akshay Kumar, Vaani Kapoor and Huma Qureshi. “The film is about a hijack that took place during Mrs Gandhi’s tenure,”  The film opened to mixed-to-negative reviews from critics, but Dutta's performance and transformation for the role received high critical acclaim.

Lara made her web debut in 2020 with the Hotstar's series Hundred playing ACP Saumya Shukla. She received praises for her role. In 2021, she appeared in the offbeat Hiccups and Hookups as Vasudha, a divorcee and single mother on a fun ride.

Kaun Banegi Shikhrawati (2022) on ZEE5 has her playing Rajkumari Devyani, in a dyfunctional royal family. The series is acclaimed by critics and audience alike.

Talk show appearances
In 2006, Lara Dutta made an appearance in the show Rendezvous with Simi Garewal hosted by actress Simi Garewal.
Dutta has made three appearances in Koffee with Karan hosted by film producer and director Karan Johar. She first made her appearances in the first season alongside Bipasha Basu and second season with Katrina Kaif. Her last appearance on the show till date was in 2010 alongside her husband Mahesh.

Lara Dutta also made an appearance in the season 1 finale of 10 Ka Dum hosted by Salman Khan alongside fellow actress Rani Mukerji.

Other work
Lara Dutta has hosted the International Indian Film Academy (IIFA) Awards 5 times. She first hosted the 3rd IIFA Awards in 2002 and subsequently the 7th IIFA Awards with Fardeen Khan in 2006, 8th IIFA Awards with Boman Irani in 2007 and the 10th IIFA Awards and 11th IIFA Awards in 2009 and 2010, respectively. The last two times she co-hosted with both Boman Irani and Riteish Deshmukh.

She was featured as a talent judge for the reality show High Fever. Dutta was also appointed as a UNFPA Goodwill Ambassador in 2001.

Lara Dutta is active in yoga, and offers a number of videos on YouTube, particularly for pre-natal yoga. During her pregnancy in 2012, she launched her own DVD which consisted of prenatal routines and meditation techniques.

In 2017 Lara Dutta began mentoring contestants of the Miss Diva contest. She stated "It's exciting to be a part of this journey in finding the perfect representative who is the Indian face of beauty, who possesses elegance, confidence, poise and intelligence. This journey has always been close to my heart and I hope this season is the one that brings us that exceptional girl who will bring the Miss Universe crown back to India".

In 2019, Lara Dutta launched her own line of beauty care products named Arias, which is a vegetarian beauty line. The brand is a culmination of her own experiences as an actor, model and mother.

Public image
Dutta has often been regarded as one of the most stylish and socially conscious actresses in Bollywood. Her modelling background opened up opportunities to play not only glamorous roles but also character driven roles in movies like Billu. She is also known for her eloquent speaking skills.

Dutta has also been a very vocal supporter of the Me Too movement in India. Dutta stated that "I think it is about time. It is fantastic as I feel the difference today is that women are standing up for women. I think that comes from a generation shift. The older generation was largely taught that women should be quiet and don't speak up; that they don't come to the forefront because they should be homemakers. Women today still do all of that. We always manage the home, take care of family, we are still the troubleshooters, we wear multiple hats in a day, we juggle a million works, and we don't let any of them drop. But now this generation of women have become more vocal, and they are empowering each other, which is a much better situation. I cannot stress enough about how essential it is to have a sisterhood, to support other women that are speaking up. Be unafraid and be unapologetic about the stand that you take, especially against male entitlement."

Filmography

Films

Web series

Television

Accolades

See also
 List of Indian film actresses
 List of Hindi film actresses
 Miss Universe 2000

References

External links

 
 
 

1978 births
Actresses from Bangalore
Actresses in Hindi cinema
Actresses in Tamil cinema
Actresses of European descent in Indian films
Beauty pageant contestants from India
Femina Miss India winners
Indian beauty pageant winners
Indian film actresses
Indian people of English descent
Indian people of German descent
Indian people of Scottish descent
Indian people of Swedish descent
Indian Roman Catholics
Indian voice actresses
Living people
Miss Universe 2000 contestants
Miss Universe winners
Filmfare Awards winners
Screen Awards winners
People from Ghaziabad, Uttar Pradesh
Punjabi people
University of Mumbai alumni
Female models from Bangalore
Female models from Uttar Pradesh